"Cost the limit of price" was a maxim coined by Josiah Warren, indicating a (prescriptive) version of the labor theory of value. Warren maintained that the just compensation for labor (or for its product) could only be an equivalent amount of labor (or a product embodying an equivalent amount). Thus, profit, rent, and interest were considered unjust economic arrangements. As Samuel Edward Konkin III put it, "the labor theory of value recognizes no distinction between profit and plunder."

In keeping with the tradition of Adam Smith's The Wealth of Nations, the "cost" of labor is considered to be the subjective cost; i.e., the amount of suffering involved in it.

Development 

The principle was set forth in Warren's Equitable Commerce (among other writings) and has been called a "mainstay of 19th century individualist anarchism". It was further advocated and popularized by Benjamin Tucker in his individualist anarchist periodical Liberty, and in his books. Tucker explained there are two kinds of Socialisms, one authoritarian (ie. Marx) and one libertarian (Proudhon and Warren), yet what both schools of Socialism have in common is the labor theory of value.  Tucker explained Warren's views as so:

Warren put his principle into practice in 1827 by establishing an experimental "equity store", called the Cincinnati Time Store, where trade was facilitated by notes backed by a promise to perform labor. This scheme was exactly that advocated by Pierre Proudhon some years later under the name mutuellisme; however, it is believed that Proudhon developed his ideas independently.

See also
 Anarchism
 Mutualism
 Mutual credit
 Property is theft

References

Mutualism (economic theory)
Anarchist theory
Theory of value (economics)
Corporate conduct